Doğançay is a village or rural quarter in Mardin Province in southeastern Turkey. It is part of the municipality Midyat. It is located in the Midyat District and the historical region of Tur Abdin. It is populated by Assyrians and by Kurds of the Zaxuran tribe.

The village had a population of 159 in 2021.

History
The Church of Mor Yuhannon in Mzizah was constructed in the 6th century and the village is first mentioned in 1296. In the early 18th century AD, Assyrians from the village of Ain Wardo settled in Mzizah. Later, Assyrians from the villages of Zaz, Kfarbe, Bashoq, Urnus, Rowen, and Merin also settled in Mzizah. The village also experienced an influx of Yazidis from nearby Kefnas in the 1870s.

In 1915, during the Assyrian genocide, the majority of the Assyrian population of the village fled to Ain Wardo, where they remained for fifty days until a truce was agreed and they were permitted to return to Mzizah. However, several Assyrians were killed on the journey to the village and many subsequently fled to Syria. In 1961, the name of the village was officially changed to Doğançay.

Notable people 

 Ciwan Haco — Born in Syria to a family from Doğançay.
 Derwich Ferho

References

Bibliography

Villages in Midyat District
Tur Abdin
Assyrian communities in Turkey
Places of the Assyrian genocide
Kurdish settlements in Mardin Province